Abdullah Al Noman is a Bangladeshi politician who is a vice-chairman of Bangladesh Nationalist Party. He is a 3-term Jatiya Sangsad member representing the Chittagong-9 constituency. He served as a minister of fisheries and food at the Second Khaleda Cabinet.

Career
Noman was elected to Parliament from Kotwali, Chittagong-9 in 1991.

On 19 August 1998, the Bureau of Anti-Corruption Commission sued Noman for failure to submit a wealth statement with Dhanmondi Police Station. The charge sheet was submitted on 30 May 2000. The case was taken over by the Anti-Corruption Commission which succeeded the Bureau of Anti-Corruption Commission in 2004.

Noman was elected to Parliament from Chittagong-9 in 2001 as a candidate of Bangladesh Nationalist Party. He served as the Minister of fisheries and livestock in the Second Khaleda Zia Cabinet.

Noman contest the 9th General Election from Chittagong-9 in 2008 as a candidate of Bangladesh Nationalist Party. He lost the election to Afsarul Amin. Noman had received 1,27,815 votes while Amin received 1,37,106 votes. Noman alleged that the election was rigged in favor of Awami League.

Charges from the 1998 Bureau of Anti-Corruption Commission case were framed against Noman with the Dhaka Divisional Special Judges’ Court on 2 February 2009. Noman filed an application with the Bangladesh High Court against the framing of the charges which was rejected by the court on 24 January 2013. He filed a leave to appeal against the verdict of Bangladesh High Court which was rejected on 25 January 2016 on a technicality.

In 2009, Noman was engaged in a struggle with Salahuddin Quader Chowdhury to take control of Bangladesh Nationalist Party in Chittagong. He was at that time the  joint secretary general of Chittagong City unit of Bangladesh Nationalist Party. In November 2009, supports of Noman vandalized Institution of Engineers, Bangladesh (IEB) auditorium in Chittagong in which the council of the Chittagong City unit of Bangladesh Nationalist Party was taking place.

On 7 April 2013, Noman was sent to jail in connection with a number of criminal cases. Jatiyatabadi Swechhasebak Dal called for a strike in Chittagong the next day protesting the decision.

Noman told reporters that he is considering quitting Bangladesh Nationalist Party in August 2016 after he did not receive a seat in the standing committee of Bangladesh Nationalist Party.

Bangladesh Police from Tongi Police Station arrested Noman on 7 May 2018 from Gazipur near the home of the Bangladesh Nationalist Party candidate of Gazipur City Corporation, Hasan Uddin Sarkar, over allegations of vandalism with 12 other activists of Bangladesh Nationalist Party. Noman was released soon after but the rest were detained by the police for questioning.

Noman reported that his rally in Chittagong on 16 December 2018, on the occasion of victory day of Bangladesh Liberation war, was attacked by armed supporters of Awami League.

Noman complained to Bangladesh Election Commission on 17 March 2020, during the Chattogram City Corporation election campaign, that Awami League activists and Bangladesh Police personnel were interfering with the election campaign of Bangladesh Nationalist Party.

References

Living people
Bangladesh Nationalist Party politicians
5th Jatiya Sangsad members
6th Jatiya Sangsad members
8th Jatiya Sangsad members
Fisheries and Livestock ministers of Bangladesh
Food ministers of Bangladesh
Labour and Employment ministers of Bangladesh
Year of birth missing (living people)
Place of birth missing (living people)